WBKT (95.3 FM) is a radio station broadcasting a country format. Licensed to Norwich, New York, United States, the station is currently owned by Townsquare Media.

References

External links

BKT
Country radio stations in the United States
Townsquare Media radio stations
1997 establishments in New York (state)
Radio stations established in 1997